Marcell Tibor Berki (born 14 June 2004) is a Hungarian professional footballer who plays as a forward for 2. Liga club Liefering.

Club career
Berki started his career with Fehérvár, then known as Videoton, in 2010, spending eight years with the Székesfehérvár-based club. He joined Austrian team Red Bull Salzburg in 2018, and signed his first professional contract in July 2022.

International career
Berki has represented Hungary at youth international level.

Career statistics

Club

Notes

References

2004 births
Living people
Hungarian footballers
Association football forwards
2. Liga (Austria) players
Fehérvár FC players
FC Red Bull Salzburg players
FC Liefering players